Córrego do Veado Biological Reserve is a biological reserve in the municipality of Pinheiros, Espírito Santo, Brazil.

Location

It is managed by the Instituto Chico Mendes de Conservação da Biodiversidade.
It became part of the Central Atlantic Forest Ecological Corridor, created in 2002.
It is named after the river of the same name, the Veado River, which flows through the reserve from west to east.
It lies in the Pinheiros municipality of Espírito Santo.
The vegetation is semi-deciduous tropical rain forest, with very tall trees and sparse undergrowth.
Although in the tropical zone, the climate is greatly influenced by the mountains.

Conservation

The Biological Reserve is a "strict nature reserve" under IUCN protected area category Ia.
The reserve was created to preserve a remnant of Atlantic forest in the northern part of the state.

In January 2014 the Federal Public Ministry in Espírito Santo gained a court ruling that ICMBio had 180 days to delimit buffer zones around the Córrego do Veado Biological Reserve as well as the nearby  Rio Preto National Forest and the  Córrego Grande Biological Reserve. 
A buffer zone is an area around a conservation unit where human activity is subject to various rules and restrictions.

Protected species in the Atlantic Forest biome are northern brown howler (Alouatta guariba guariba), oncilla (Leopardus tigrinus), red-browed amazon (Amazona rhodocorytha), scalloped antbird (Myrmeciza ruficauda), white-eared parakeet (Pyrrhura leucotis) and ochre-marked parakeet (Pyrrhura cruentata).

References

Sources

1984 establishments in Brazil
Biological reserves of Brazil
Protected areas of Espírito Santo
Protected areas established in 1984
Protected areas of the Atlantic Forest